Sananda may refer to:

 Sananda (magazine), a Bengali women's magazine
 Sananda (New Age), a name used by some New Age groups for the resurrected Master Jesus
 Sananda samadhi, the third of four samadhis described in the Yoga Sutra 1:17 by Patanjali
 Sananda TV, a 24-hour Bengali General Entertainment Channel owned by ABP Group

See also
 Ananda (disambiguation)
 Sananda Maitreya (born 1962), an American singer–songwriter
 Sananda Maitreya (New Age)
 Sanandaj